Luisa, Lady Naysum Saravanamuttu ( Arunachalam; 1897 - 19 January 1941) was a Ceylonese politician. She was the second female member of State Council of Ceylon and the second elected female legislator in Sri Lanka.

She was married to Sir Ratnasothy Saravanamuttu a physician and politician, who in 1931, was elected to the first State Council of Ceylon representing Colombo North. Her husband was removed from the State Council after he was found guilty of corrupt practices by an election Judge. Naysum became the second female member of the State Council in 1931, when she won her husband's seat in a by-election. She was re-elected to the second State Council in 1936 and retained the position until her death in January 1941.

See also
List of political families in Sri Lanka

References

1897 births
1941 deaths
Members of the 1st State Council of Ceylon
Members of the 2nd State Council of Ceylon
Women legislators in Sri Lanka
People from Northern Province, Sri Lanka
20th-century Sri Lankan women politicians
Wives of knights